Trisopterus esmarkii, the Norway pout, is a species of fish in the cod family. It is found in the Barents Sea, North Sea, Baltic Sea, off the coasts of Norway, Iceland, the British Isles and elsewhere in the northeast Atlantic Ocean.

It is extensively fished, mostly for conversion into fishmeal, with 877,910 t taken in 1974, and only 39,223 t taken in 2008.

References

External links
 

Gadidae
Commercial fish
Fish of the Atlantic Ocean
Taxa named by Sven Nilsson
Fish described in 1855